This is a list of members of the Tasmanian House of Assembly between the 1862 elections and the 1866 elections.

Notes
  On 20 January 1863, James Whyte became Premier of Tasmania and appointed Charles Meredith and Robert Byron Miller to the Ministry. They were therefore required to resign and contest ministerial by-elections, at which they were both returned on 5 February 1863.
  In March 1863, John Meredith, the member for Deloraine, resigned. Charles Grant won the resulting by-election on 18 May 1863.
  In June 1863, James Grant, the member for Fingal, resigned. John Swan won the resulting by-election on 28 July 1863.
  In September 1863, Alexander Clerke, the member for Ringwood, resigned. Alfred Horne won the resulting by-election on 24 November 1863.
  In January 1864, Edward Abbott, the member for Clarence, resigned to successfully contest the Legislative Council division of Cambridge. David Lewis won the resulting by-election on 24 February 1864.
  In May 1864, D'Arcy Haggitt and Maxwell Miller, both members of the five-member seat of Hobart Town, resigned. Miller had resigned to take up the role of Clerk-Assistant and Librarian of the Parliament of Tasmania. They were replaced on 1 June 1864 at a by-election by Charles Degraves and John Lord.
  In May 1864, Thomas Chapman, the member for Campbell Town, resigned on account of personal bankruptcy. William Lambert Dobson was elected unopposed on 21 June 1864.
  In May 1865, John Sharland, the member for Cumberland, resigned. William Sibley won the resulting by-election on 7 June 1865.
  In May 1865, Alfred Horne, the member for Ringwood, resigned. At the resulting by-election on 26 June 1865, John Meredith was returned unopposed.
  On 26 September 1865, William Race Allison, one of the five members for Hobart Town, died. Charles Cansdell won the resulting by-election on 17 October 1865.
  In October 1865, Thomas Knight, the member for George Town, resigned. John Scott won the resulting by-election on 14 November 1865.

Sources
 
 Parliament of Tasmania (2020). The Parliament of Tasmania from 1856

Members of Tasmanian parliaments by term
19th-century Australian politicians